In Inuit mythology, Tarqiup Inua ("Master of the Moon") is a lunar deity.

Names include:

The later names are associated with Sun and moon (Inuit myth).

Mythology
Tarqiup Inua is a god of fertility, the morally righteous and for the Inuit of Alaska - the animals. The spirit of the moon is a man, a mighty hunter who dwells in the skies.

See also 
 Inua
 List of lunar deities

Referances

Inuit gods
Lunar gods